Enrique Tornero Hernández (born 30 May 1980 in Plasencia, Cáceres) is an S9 swimmer from Spain. He competed at the 1996 Summer Paralympics, winning a gold medal in the 400 meter freestyle race and a bronze medal in the 4 x 100 meter 34 points freestyle relay. He competed at the 2000 Summer Paralympics, winning a silver medal in the 400 meter freestyle race.

References

External links 
 
 

1980 births
Living people
Spanish male backstroke swimmers
Spanish male medley swimmers
Spanish male freestyle swimmers
Paralympic swimmers of Spain
Paralympic gold medalists for Spain
Paralympic silver medalists for Spain
Paralympic bronze medalists for Spain
Paralympic medalists in swimming
Swimmers at the 1996 Summer Paralympics
Swimmers at the 2000 Summer Paralympics
Medalists at the 1996 Summer Paralympics
Medalists at the 2000 Summer Paralympics
People from Plasencia
Sportspeople from the Province of Cáceres
S9-classified Paralympic swimmers
Medalists at the World Para Swimming Championships